The Oxford Centre for Gene Function is a multidisciplinary research institute in the University of Oxford, England. It is directed by Frances Ashcroft, Kay Davies and Peter Donnelly.

It involves the departments of Human anatomy and genetics, Physiology, and Statistics.

External links
 Oxford Centre for Gene Function website
 Wellcome Trust Centre for Human Genetics

Departments of the University of Oxford
Genetics in the United Kingdom
Human genetics
Research institutes in Oxford